Raham, a biblical character, was mentioned in the genealogical lists of 1 Chronicles, in 1 Chronicles 2:44. He was a descendant of Caleb and Hezron, a son of Shema, and the father of Jorkeam.

References

Books of Chronicles people